The Gallant Men is a 1962–1963 ABC Warner Bros. Television series which depicted an infantry company of American soldiers fighting their way through Italy in World War II.

Description
The Gallant Men dramatized the experiences of the fictional Able Company within the 36th Infantry Division, Fifth Army, beginning with the division's amphibious landing at Salerno, Italy, on September 9, 1943. The pilot episode was directed by Robert Altman.

The company's commander was Capt. Jim Benedict, played by William Reynolds, who later appeared in the long-running series, The F.B.I. Their exploits were narrated by a newspaper correspondent — Conley Wright, played by Robert McQueeney — who accompanied them on their missions. The show lasted only one season. It succumbed to tough competition from the other networks and tepid responses from critics and audiences. The show also faced unfavorable comparisons with ABC's other World War II series launched the same year, Combat!.

The Gallant Men tended to be formulaic in plotting and characterization, with such stereotypes as ladies' man PFC Pete D'Angelo (played by Eddie Fontaine), hard-as-nails Sgt. John McKenna (Richard X. Slattery), and inseparable buddies Pvt. Ernie Lucavich (Roland La Starza) and Pvt. Sam Hanson (Robert Gothie). The regular cast would unrealistically dispatch large numbers of German troops while experiencing minimal or no injuries themselves in the Italian campaign, where historically the Allies suffered heavy casualties from determined German resistance that lasted until the end of World War II in Europe. Although promotional materials for the series promised a dramatization of the Italian campaign from Salerno to Rome, the series played out nearly in real time. Its 26 episodes take place between September 1943 and early spring 1944.

The series blended original footage with shots from wartime newsreels and stock footage from Warner Bros. war films such as Force of Arms, Darby's Rangers and A Walk in the Sun.

Regular cast

Episode list

Development
Warner Bros. television producer William T. Orr tried as early as 1960 to generate interest in a weekly dramatic series set in World War II. The early concept was called Battle Zone. The reception he found from the three major TV networks was lukewarm at best. "It wasn't that the networks were hostile to the idea," Orr told The New York Times in 1962. "They seemed to be in a kind of morass of indecision about it." Orr also predicted that, if Gallant Men were successful, networks would warm to more series set during the war. Looking for more original programming in its 1962-63 TV season, ABC gave the green light to Battle Zone, which was re-titled The Gallant Men.

The pilot episode was budgeted at $170,000 ($1.46 million in 2020 dollars). In preparation for shooting, director Robert Altman and story editor Richard Bluel screened John Huston's 1945 documentary The Battle of San Pietro. Eight days were spent on production, broken down into one day each for tests and post-production, and six shooting days. Primary filming took place in December 1961 and January 1962. Warner Bros. offered Altman a contract to continue directing the series, but the director found himself dissatisfied with Warner's production style and accepted an offer from Combat! executive producer Selig J. Seligman instead.

Members of the principal cast received basic military training on the Warner backlot over the spring of 1962, led by two veterans of the Italian campaign, Maj. Richard Lauer and SFC Robert McClintic. The cast familiarized themselves with action sequences using trenches and bomb craters dug by studio special effects personnel.

In May 1962, Army Lt. Col. David Sisco was tapped to be the series' military adviser. By coincidence, Sisco was friends with. Maj. Homer Jones, the technical adviser for Combat! Sisco served in the 36th Infantry Division in Italy, the group depicted in The Gallant Men. His job wasn't just limited to teaching the actors how to properly shoot; at times, Sisco and his Army superiors nixed or altered storylines so as not to cast soldiers or the Army itself in a negative light. At least one television critic said such changes weakened the show.

Cancellation and syndication
In December 1962, ABC pulled the plug on The Roy Rogers Show, opening an hour-long gap (7:30 - 8:30 p.m. ET) in the network's Saturday primetime schedule. Gallant Men was moved into that timeslot. By February 1963, doubtful reports began to circulate about The Gallant Men'''s future. Late that month, ABC announced it would not order a second season, and the same week William T. Orr was removed as head of Warner's television division. Warner Bros. then tried to sell commissioned but unproduced episode scripts to Combat! That effort may have borne fruit, as three episodes from the second season of Combat! are credited to Gallant Men writers.

Before the year was out, Warner Bros. was selling the series' 26 episodes to local stations across the country as part of its syndicated program offerings. A magazine ad in February 1964 claimed Gallant Men reruns beat first-run network programming in the New York City television market, and that the series was running in 20 markets across the United States. The series remained part of Warner Bros.' television syndication package until at least 1968.

Home media
On July 24, 2012, Warner Bros. released The Gallant Men: The Complete Series on DVD in Region 1 via their Warner Archive Collection. This is a Manufacture-on-Demand (MOD) release, available exclusively in the US and only through Warner's online store.

Tie-ins
 Eddie Fontaine sang lyrics to Sy Miller's end title song My Heart Belongs to You on one episode with Warner Bros. Records releasing the song of 45rpm
 The Louis Marx and Company released a 1963 military playset with character figures from the show joining the usual American toy soldiers.
 In 1966, Senator Everett McKinley Dirksen recorded the song "Gallant Men."  It became a hit in the U.S., reaching #29 on the Billboard'' Hot 100 during the winter of 1967.  It also reached #100 in Canada.
 In 1963, Dell Publishing produced one issue of a comic book based on the show. The comic book contained two original standalone stories not drawn from the broadcast episodes.

References

External links
 Classic TV Archive page for The Gallant Men 

 AmericanLife TV Network page for The Gallant Men
 

American Broadcasting Company original programming
1962 American television series debuts
1963 American television series endings
World War II television drama series
Television series based on actual events
Television series set in 1943
Television series set in 1944
Television series by Warner Bros. Television Studios
English-language television shows
Black-and-white American television shows
Television shows set in Italy
Television series about the United States Army